Chrysogorgiidae is a family of soft corals in the suborder Calcaxonia.

References 

 Bayer, F.M. and K.M. Muzik. 1976. New genera and species of the holaxonian family Chrysogorgiidae (Octocorallia: Gorgonacea). Zoologische Mededelingen (Leiden) 50: 65-90.

External links 

 
 

 
Calcaxonia
Cnidarian families